John Alfred Dunn (born 21 June 1944) is an English footballer who played as a goalkeeper in the Football League.

Dunn signed professional forms for Chelsea in January 1962, from the Juniors.
A sound and reliable goalkeeper, he spent four years as understudy to Peter Bonetti.

References

External links
 

1944 births
Living people
English footballers
Footballers from Barking, London
Association football goalkeepers
Charlton Athletic F.C. players
Chelsea F.C. players
Torquay United F.C. players
Aston Villa F.C. players
Redbridge F.C. players
English Football League players
Tooting & Mitcham United F.C. players